Protolychnis chlorotoma is a moth in the family Lecithoceridae. It was described by Edward Meyrick in 1914. It is found in Malawi.

The wingspan is about 12 mm. The forewings are dark purple-fuscous with a direct transverse whitish-ochreous streak just before the middle, slightly angulated inwards towards the costa. There is a fine series of scattered whitish-ochreous scales from a dot on the costa at four-fifths to the dorsum before the tornus, angulated outwards in the middle. The hindwings are dark grey, lighter in the disc anteriorly.

References

Moths described in 1914
Protolychnis